The Iapó River is a river of Paraná state in southern Brazil. It is a tributary of the Tibagi River.

The river is known for the scenic Guartelá Canyon, which is protected by the  Guartelá State Park, created in 1992.

See also
List of rivers of Paraná

References

Rivers of Paraná (state)
Castro, Paraná